[11C]ME@HAPTHI is a radiotracer of the norepinephrine transporter for positron emission tomography.

References

PET radiotracers